Nicolas Bricaire de la Dixmerie (c. 1730 – November 26, 1791), French man of letters, was born at Lamothe (Haute-Marne). While still young he removed to Paris, where the rest of his life was spent in literary activity.

His numerous works include Contes philosophiques et moraux (1765), Les Deux Ages du goût et du génie sous Louis XIV et sous Louis XV (1769), a parallel and contrast, in which the decision is given in favor of the latter; L'Espagne littéraire (1774); Eloge de Voltaire (1779) and Eloge de Montaigne (1781).

See also
Les Neuf Sœurs

References

External links
 

1730s births
1791 deaths
18th-century French writers
18th-century French male writers
French essayists
French male essayists
18th-century essayists